The Turnpike was a ride at Kennywood amusement park in Pittsburgh, United States. It was introduced in spring 1966. The Turnpike originally had gasoline-powered cars, which were later replaced with electric cars.

Kennywood decommissioned the Turnpike in 2010 but announced that the ride would return in the future in a different location.  The Turnpike was replaced with a steel coaster called the Sky Rocket.

References

Amusement rides introduced in 1966
Amusement rides that closed in 2010
Kennywood